Jaruplund Højskole is the only Danish folk high school in Southern Schleswig, Germany and is located 10 km south of the border in Flensburg. As a meeting point between two cultures, the school's programs focus on promoting greater understanding between the two nations and Europe at large.

History 
The first Danish folk high school in Southern Schleswig, Aagaard Højskole, was open from 1863 until 1889. After the Second World War, a public push to renew relations between Denmark and Germany led to the reestablishment of a folk high school in the area. 

The school first opened in 1950 after land was donated by its founder, Meta Røh. Originally, classes had taken place in buildings formerly used for refugees after World War II. Today, the former refugee barracks have been replaced by modern buildings. Its modern facilities include an in-house cinema, computer lab, sauna, silver workshop, and 37 single and double ensuite bedrooms.

Rectors 

 Jørgen Holm Jessen, 1950–1954
 Niels Bøgh-Andersen, 1954–1972
 Karl Andersen, 1972–1979
 Arne Hyldkrog, 1979
 Egon Rasmussen, 1980–1994
 Dieter Paul Küssner, 1994–2014
 Karsten B. Dressø, 2014–present

See also
 Folk High School

References

Danish schools in Southern Schleswig
High schools in Germany
1950 establishments in Germany
Educational institutions established in 1950
Folk high schools
Buildings and structures in Flensburg